The Junagadh State Railway (JunSR) was a metre gauge railway owned by the Junagadh State and initially worked by the Bhavnagar–Gondal–Junagadh–Porbandar Railway. From 1911 the JunSR worked itself as an independent system, owned by the Junagadh Durbar, until 1948 when it became part of the Saurashtra Railway.

Rolling stock 
In 1936, the company owned 18 locomotives, 2 railcars, 99 coaches and 373 goods wagons.

Classification
It was labeled as a Class II railway according to Indian Railway Classification System of 1926.

Conversion to broad gauge
The railway was converted to   broad gauge progressively in 2000s.

References 

Saurashtra (region)
Defunct railway companies of India
Metre gauge railways in India
History of rail transport in Gujarat
1948 disestablishments in India
Indian companies established in 1918
Railway companies established in 1918